Nyayavidhi is a 1986 Indian Malayalam-language film, directed by Joshiy and produced by Joy Thomas. The film stars Mammootty, Shobhana, Sukumaran and Lalu Alex. The film has musical score by M. K. Arjunan.

Plot
Paramu and Johnny frame Unnithan for a murder of a Govt. Official committed by the latter. They manage to do so with corrupt policeman's help, steal businessman Unnithan's black money, trap Malayil Thomas, another businessman, and become successful. Paramu squanders the money and chooses to work as a henchman for an Anglo-Indian businessman named McPherson and Johnny builds himself up as a businessman with the money. To avoid being captured in a raid, McPherson asks Paramu to safe-keep 100 lakhs (1 crore) of his unaccounted money for two months. Paramu entrusts the money to Johnny, but they fall out because of Unnithan's daughter, Geetha, who now is a low life due to circumstances. Paramu marries Geetha out of guilt and Johnny becomes his enemy. Johnny becomes paranoid and starts to eliminate everyone who he distrusts. Johnny with the help of Mathews informs McPherson that Paramu has run off with the money, and they two join hands to eliminate Paramu and retrieve the money. In the end, Johnny shoots Paramu and vice versa and die near the fields where they committed their first murder together.

Cast

Soundtrack
The music was composed by M. K. Arjunan with lyrics by Shibu Chakravarthy.

Box office
The film was average.

References

External links
 

1986 films
1980s Malayalam-language films
Films directed by Joshiy